The Indiana Hoosiers field hockey team is the intercollegiate field hockey program representing Indiana University. The school competes in the Big Ten Conference in Division I of the National Collegiate Athletic Association (NCAA). The Indiana field hockey team plays its home games at the IU Field Hockey Complex on the university campus in Bloomington, Indiana. Indiana has appeared in the NCAA tournament twice and finished runner-up in the Big Ten three times since the field hockey program was created in 2000. The team is currently coached by Kayla Bashore.

History 
Field hockey has been a varsity sport at Indiana University since 2000. The Hoosiers have been a member of the Big Ten Conference and have been coached by Amy Robertson in each season of the program's existence. The team has twice appeared in the NCAA tournament, in 2005 and 2009, playing a total of three games. Indiana defeated North Carolina in the first round in 2005, while it was eliminated by Wake Forest both in the 2005 second round and the 2009 first round. The Hoosiers' best regular-season performance in the Big Ten has been second place, which it has accomplished three times, in 2005, 2006, and 2009. Indiana has also played in the Big Ten tournament championship game twice, losing both, to Michigan in 2005 and to Michigan State in 2009.

Season-by-season results 

Season-by-season results through the end of the 2016 season

Awards and accolades

All-Americans

Awards and accolades through the end of the 2014 season

Stadium 
Indiana has played its home games at the IU Field Hockey Complex since its opening in August 2007.  The complex has a seating capacity of 500 and features a Polytan playing surface as well as a Nelson Water Cannon system for watering the field before play. Built adjacent to Bill Armstrong Stadium, the home of the Indiana men's and women's soccer teams, the IU Field Hockey Complex serves the Hoosiers field hockey program as a practice venue in addition to as a game venue. In August 2009, the Ireland Family Fieldhouse was added to the complex, which houses the team's locker room, a staff meeting room, and equipment storage space. Prior to the construction of the IU Field Hockey Complex, the Indiana field hockey team played its home games inside Mellencamp Pavilion from 2000 to 2006, making it one of only a few American collegiate field hockey programs to play indoors.

See also
List of NCAA Division I field hockey programs

References

External links